The Legislative Assembly of Nunavut is the legislative assembly for the Canadian territory of Nunavut. The seat of the Assembly is the Legislative Building of Nunavut in Iqaluit.

Prior to the creation of Nunavut as a Canadian territory on April 1, 1999, the 1999 Nunavut general election was held on February 15 to determine the 1st Nunavut Legislature. The Legislative Assembly was opened by Elizabeth II, Queen of Canada, on October 7, 2002, during her Golden Jubilee tour of Canada. In her speech the Queen stated: "I am proud to be the first member of the Canadian Royal Family to be greeted in Canada's newest territory."

Prior to the opening of the Legislative Building in October 1999 the members met in the gymnasium of the Inuksuk High School.

The Hansard of the assembly is published in Inuktitut (syllabics) and English, making the territory one of only three Canadian jurisdictions to produce a bilingual Hansard, along with the Legislative Assembly of New Brunswick and the Parliament of Canada in Ottawa, Ontario.

The territory operates by consensus government; there are no political parties. Approximately two weeks after an election, the newly elected legislature meets in a special session called the Nunavut Leadership Forum to select the Executive Council, or cabinet.

Members of the Legislative Assembly are sworn in by the commissioner of Nunavut.

Current members

There are currently 22 seats in the legislature. The current assembly is the sixth in the territory's history, and had its membership selected in the 2021 election. Two electoral districts did not have their results finalized on election night, due to margin of less than two percent between two candidates, necessitating a judicial recount. The results of the recount were confirmed by 2 November.

Notes
  After recount
  Acclaimed

G7 Summit 2010
G7 finance ministers met at the Legislative Building in February 2010 for a two-day meeting. Security at the summit was provided by the Royal Canadian Mounted Police (RCMP).

See also
 List of Nunavut general elections

References

External links

The official website

 
Politics of Nunavut
Nunavut
Nunavut